John Carel "Johnny" de Mol (born 12 January 1979 in Laren) is a Dutch actor and presenter. He is the son of John de Mol Jr. and Willeke Alberti.

Filmography

External links

1979 births
Living people
People from Laren, North Holland
Dutch male film actors
Dutch male television actors